Re-Constriction Records was a division of Cargo Music based in California. The label was founded in 1992 and headed by Chase, who was previously the Music Director at KCR, a student radio station on the campus of San Diego State University. They specialized in releasing bands belonging to the industrial, aggrotech and EBM genres.

After the label folded, Chase went to work for Access Communications where he worked for 14 years doing video game-related public relations, including helping to launch Twitch in 2011. In May 2013, he took a staff job at Twitch overseeing all of their PR efforts. In 2019, he left Twitch  and shortly thereafter joined StreamElements.

History
Chase contacted Belgium-based industrial label KK Records, a division of Cargo Music, to arrange for product servicing for the station which led to him getting a job with Cargo. While doing promotional work for their KK label in North America, Chase convinced Cargo Music to allow him to start a new division called Re-Constriction Records.

The first band signed to the label was Diatribe, followed by 16 Volt and The Clay People. All of which helped to define the "Re-Con" sound of heavy guitars over electronics with vocalists who did not overprocess their voices. Chase adhered to this blueprint throughout much of the label's existence. The label's debut release was the 1992 EP Nothing by Diatribe.

The top selling release on his label was Shut Up Kitty, the first domestic Industrial dance cover song compilation.  This would help to inspire other compilations, notably 21st Circuitry's Newer Wave and Newer Wave 2.0 releases.  Other unique industrial cover song releases that predated the popularity of this trend included Operation Beatbox (covers of Hip Hop songs), TV Terror (a 2 CD compilation featuring covers of Television theme songs), Cyberpunk Fiction (A satirical spoof of the Pulp Fiction soundtrack) and Nod's Tacklebox o' Fun (assorted pop hits).

Re-Constriction Records folded in 1999 after having released approximately 40 records. While running Re-Constriction, Chase founded, owned and ran a compilation-only label called If It Moves... which featured Torture Tech Overdrive (1991), The Cyberflesh Conspiracy (1992), Rivet Head Culture (1993) and Scavengers in the Matrix (1994). The Cyberflesh Conspiracy featured the only song that Stabbing Westward released on CD prior to being signed to a major label, while Rivet Head Culture was notable for popularizing the term "rivet head" (a descriptor for fans of industrial dance music) and featuring a song by Raw Dog, an unreleased side-project by Nivek Ogre and Dave Ogilvie of Skinny Puppy.

Discography
 Re-Constriction Records discography

Notable artists
 16volt
 Apparatus
 Christ Analogue
 The Clay People
 Collide
 Diatribe
 H3llb3nt
 Hexedene
 Iron Lung Corp
 Killing Floor
 Leæther Strip
 Non-Aggression Pact
 Numb
 Purr Machine
 SMP
 Society Burning
 Swamp Terrorists
 Tinfed
 Vampire Rodents
 Waiting for God

References

External links
 
 

American record labels
Record labels established in 1991
Record labels disestablished in 1999
Industrial record labels
1991 establishments in California
1999 disestablishments in California